Immunoglobulin superfamily, member 1 is a plasma membrane glycoprotein encoded by the IGSF1 gene, which maps to the X chromosome in humans and other mammalian species.

Function 

IGSF1's function in normal cells is unresolved.  The protein is a member of the immunoglobulin (Ig) superfamily. It was predicted to contain 12 Ig loops, a transmembrane domain, and a short cytoplasmic tail. However, during translation of the protein, it is cleaved into amino- and carboxy-terminal domains (NTD and CTD, respectively). Only the CTD is trafficked to the plasma membrane. The NTD is trapped within the endoplasmic reticulum (ER). Pathogenic mutations in the IGSF1 gene block the transport of the CTD to the plasma membrane.

Clinical relevance 

Mutations in IGSF1 cause a condition called IGSF1 deficiency syndrome or central hypothyroidism/testicular enlargement (CHTE). The condition, which affects an estimated 1:100,000 people, is more common in males than females. Most affected males are discovered through neonatal screening for hypothyroidism. The extent of hypothyroidism is variable, but most male cases require treatment with thyroid hormone replacement. Males with IGSF1 deficiency exhibit enlarged testicles (also known as macroorchidism) and a delay in the development of secondary sexual characteristics. Post-pubertally, there is no evidence of impaired fertility in these men.

The IGSF1 gene is also active in the brain and in the developing liver. It can also become reactivated in liver cancer (hepatocellular carcinoma).

Animal model 

Mice lacking a functional Igsf1 gene similarly exhibit hypothyroidism of central origin. The IGSF1 gene is particularly active in the pituitary gland. The pituitary synthesizes and secretes thyroid-stimulating hormone (TSH). TSH, in turn, stimulates production of the thyroid hormones, thyroxine and triiodothyronine, by the thyroid gland. TSH secretion is controlled by thyrotropin-releasing hormone (TRH), which is released by neurons in the hypothalamus of the brain. In Igsf1 deficient mice, the receptor for TRH is downregulated in the pituitary. This decrease could explain, at least in part, the central hypothyroidism observed in both humans and mice with IGSF1 deficiency. How the loss of IGSF1 causes a decrease in TRH receptors is presently unknown.

References

Further reading